Harrogate is a spa town and the administrative centre of the Borough of Harrogate in North Yorkshire, England. Historically in the West Riding of Yorkshire, the town is a tourist destination and its visitor attractions include its spa waters and RHS Harlow Carr gardens.  away from the town centre is the Yorkshire Dales National Park and the Nidderdale AONB. Harrogate grew out of two smaller settlements, High Harrogate and Low Harrogate, in the 17th century. For three consecutive years (2013–2015), polls voted the town as "the happiest place to live" in Britain.

Harrogate spa water contains iron, sulphur and common salt. The town became known as 'The English Spa' in the Georgian era, after its waters were discovered in the 16th century. In the 17th and 18th centuries its 'chalybeate' waters (containing iron) were a popular health treatment, and the influx of wealthy but sickly visitors contributed significantly to the wealth of the town.

Harrogate railway station and Harrogate bus station in the town centre provide transport connections. The main roads through the town are the A61, connecting Harrogate to Leeds and Ripon, and the A59, connecting the town to York and Skipton. Harrogate is also connected to Wetherby and the A1(M) by the A661, while the A658 from Bradford forms a bypass around the south of the town. Harrogate had a population of 73,576 at the 2011 UK census; the built-up area comprising Harrogate and nearby Knaresborough had a population of 89,060, while the figure for the much wider Borough of Harrogate, comprising Harrogate, Knaresborough, Ripon, as well as a number of smaller settlements and a large rural area, was 157,869.

The town motto is Arx celebris fontibus, which means "a citadel famous for its springs".

Toponym
The name Harrogate is first attested in the 1330s as Harwegate, Harougat and Harrowgate. The origin of the name is uncertain.  It may derive from Old Norse hǫrgr 'a heap of stones, cairn' + gata 'street', in which case the name presumably meant 'road to the cairn'. Another possibility is that the name means "the way to Harlow". The form Harlowgate is known from 1518, and apparently in the court rolls of Edward II.

History

In medieval times Harrogate was a place on the borders of the township of Bilton with Harrogate in the ancient Parish of Knaresborough, and the parish of Pannal, also known as Beckwith with Rossett. The part within the township of Bilton developed into the community of High Harrogate, and the part within Pannal developed into the community of Low Harrogate. Both communities were within the Royal Forest of Knaresborough. In 1372 King Edward III granted the Royal Forest to his son John, Duke of Lancaster (also known as John of Gaunt), and the Duchy of Lancaster became the principal landowner in Harrogate.

Harrogate's development is owed to the discovery of its chalybeate- and sulphur-rich spring water from the 16th century. The first mineral spring was discovered in 1571 by William Slingsby who found that water from the Tewit Well in High Harrogate possessed similar properties to that from springs in the Belgian town of Spa, which gave its name to spa towns. The medicinal properties of the waters were publicised by Edmund Deane; his book, Spadacrene Anglica, or the English Spa Fountain was published in 1626.

In the 17th and 18th centuries further chalybeate springs were discovered in High Harrogate, and both chalybeate and sulphur springs were found in Low Harrogate. The two communities attracted many visitors. A number of inns were opened for visitors in High Harrogate in the 17th century (the Queen's Head, the Granby, the Dragon and the World's End). In Low Harrogate, the Crown was open by the mid-18th century, and possibly earlier.

In accordance with an Enclosure Act of 1770, promoted by the Duchy of Lancaster, the Royal Forest of Knaresborough was enclosed. The enclosure award of 1778 clarified ownership of land in the Harrogate area.  Under the award,  of land, which included the springs known at that time, were reserved as a public common, The Stray, which has remained public open space. The Enclosure Award facilitated development around the Stray. During the 19th century, the area between High Harrogate and Low Harrogate, which until then had remained separate communities a mile apart, was developed, and what is now the central area of Harrogate was built on high ground overlooking Low Harrogate.  An area to the north of the developing town was reserved to the Duchy of Lancaster, and was developed for residential building.  To provide entertainment for the increasing numbers of visitors the Georgian Theatre was built in 1788. Bath Hospital (later the Royal Bath Hospital) was built in 1826. The Royal Pump Room was built in 1842. The site of Tewit Well is marked by a dome on the Stray. Other wells can be found in the Valley Gardens and Royal Pump Room museum.

In 1870, engineering inventor Samson Fox perfected the process of creating water gas, in the basement laboratory of Grove House. After constructing a trial plant at his home on Skipton Road, making it the first house in Yorkshire to have gas lighting and heating; he built a town-sized plant to supply Harrogate. After Parliament Street became the world's first route to be lit by water-gas, newspapers commented: "Samson Fox has captured the sunlight for Harrogate." After donating the town's first fire engine, and building the town's theatre, he was elected mayor for three years, an unbroken record.

In 1893 Harrogate doctor George Oliver was the first to observe the effect of adrenaline on the circulation.

Harrogate's popularity declined after the First World War. During the Second World War, Harrogate's large hotels accommodated government offices evacuated from London, paving the way for the town to become a commercial, conference, and exhibition centre.

Former employers in the town were the Central Electricity Generating Board (CEGB), the Milk Marketing Board and ICI who occupied offices and laboratories at Hornbeam Park where Crimplene was invented in the 1950s and named after the nearby Crimple Valley and beck.

In 2007, two metal detectorists found the Harrogate hoard, a 10th-century Viking treasure hoard, near Harrogate. The hoard contains almost 700 coins and other items from as far away as Afghanistan. The hoard was described by the British Museum as the most important find of its type in Britain for 150 years.

Governance

In 1884 the Municipal Borough of Harrogate was created, taking High Harrogate from the civil parish of Bilton with Harrogate and Low Harrogate from the civil parish of Pannal.  The borough absorbed neighbouring areas in subsequent years, including the whole of the civil parishes of Bilton and Starbeck, and a large part of the civil parish of Pannal, including the village of Pannal, in 1938.  The municipal borough was abolished in 1974, when Harrogate was transferred from the West Riding to North Yorkshire and became part of the wider Borough of Harrogate.  Harrogate then became an unparished area, with no local government of its own.

The MP for the Harrogate and Knaresborough constituency is Andrew Jones, a Conservative. He was elected in 2010, ousting the Liberal Democrats who had won the seat at the previous three general elections.  He subsequently won re-election in the 2015, 2017 and 2019 (albeit with a reduced majority) general elections.

The town is governed by Harrogate Borough Council, which since the 2010 election has had a Conservative majority.

Twin Towns
The Borough of Harrogate is twinned with:

 Bagnères-de-Luchon, France (since 1953)
 Barrie, Canada (since 2013)
 Harrogate, Tennessee, United States
 Montecatini Terme, Italy (since 1962)
 Wellington, New Zealand

Geography

The town has good commuter services for people who work in the City of Leeds, City of Bradford, York, East Riding of Yorkshire and North Yorkshire in general. Harrogate is prosperous and has some of the highest property prices in England, with many properties in the town and surrounding villages valued at £1 million or more, it is generally considered the most expensive place to live in the North of England. Fulwith Mill Lane in Harrogate is the most expensive street in Yorkshire.

Harrogate is situated on the edge of the Yorkshire Dales, with the Vale of York to the east and the upland Yorkshire Dales to the west and north-west. It has a dry and mild climate, typical of places in the rain shadow of the Pennines. It is on the A59 from Skipton to York.

Climate
Harrogate's climate is classified as warm and temperate. There is significant rainfall throughout the year in Harrogate. Even the driest month still has a lot of rainfall. The Köppen-Geiger climate classification is Cfb. The average annual temperature in Harrogate is 48 °F (8.9 °C). In a year, the average rainfall is 29 inches (742 mm).

Divisions

Central Harrogate is bounded by 'the Stray' or 'Two Hundred acres' to the south and west, and borders High Harrogate and the Duchy estate to the east and north respectively. It is a district centre for retail and the Victoria Shopping Centre houses a number of major chains. Pedestrianised Cambridge Street and Oxford Street are the main high streets, and Harrogate Theatre is on Oxford Street. Parliament Street, Montpellier and James Street offer designer shopping and upmarket department stores. An Odeon cinema is located on the edge of central Harrogate, as are Asda and Waitrose supermarkets. Marks and Spencer has a large food hall in its store on Oxford Street. A number of bars and restaurants can be found on Cheltenham Crescent and John Street, while the Royal Baths and Parliament Street are at the centre of the town's nightlife. The southern end of central Harrogate consists largely of detached houses that have been converted to offices, although Harrogate Magistrates' Court and Harrogate Central Library can be found on Victoria Avenue. Some upmarket boutiques are situated along the Stray in central southern Harrogate.
Oatlands is a wealthy area in the south of Harrogate. It includes two schools, Oatlands Primary School and Oatlands Infant School, and some allotments.
Woodlands is a large area in south-east Harrogate which adjoins Starbeck/Knareborough Road. It is home to Harrogate Town F.C., Willow Tree Primary School, Morrisons and Sainsbury's supermarkets as well as the Woodlands pub.

Bilton is a large area of Harrogate with many churches, stores and schools. It has several schools, Richard Taylor School, Woodfield and Bilton Grange. Poets' Corner is known for its 'poetic' street names and expensive housing. On the first May bank holiday each year the Bilton Gala takes place. The first gala was held in 1977 and the event raises money for local groups and organisations.
Jennyfields is a large, modern area in the north west of Harrogate, it has two schools, Saltergate Infant School and Saltergate Primary School. The town's main public swimming pool is located on the edge of Jennyfield.
The Duchy estate is an affluent area close to central Harrogate where most houses are large detached homes or large detached homes converted into flats. There are several private schools, notably Harrogate Ladies' College. There is a golf club and open countryside for walking.

Starbeck is a large area to the east of Harrogate with a railway station with trains to elsewhere in Harrogate on to Leeds, Knaresborough and York. A frequent bus service links Starbeck to Harrogate and Knaresborough. A number of schools, churches and shops are situated in Starbeck.
Pannal is to the south of Harrogate, off the A61 road. It retains much of its village character. A commuter station links it to Harrogate and on to York, Knaresborough and Leeds.
High Harrogate is an inner section to the east of the town centre. It is focused on Westmoreland Street and the A59 Skipton Road, where a number of shops and cafés are located. Expensive terraced houses line the Stray, which stops in High Harrogate.
Low Harrogate is an inner section to the west of the town centre. It is the focus of most tourist activity in the town, with the Royal Pump Room, Mercer Art Gallery and the Valley Gardens.
Harlow Hill is a district to the west of the town, accessed by Otley Road. It has a number of new developments and an office park. It is known for RHS Harlow Carr Gardens. Harrogate Spa bottling plant is on Harlow Hill, as is a water treatment centre.

New Park is a small area to the north of Harrogate with a primary school. There are a number of terraced houses and some light industrial and commercial premises.
Wheatlands is a wealthy district south of the Stray. It is residential and has two high schools, St Aidan's and St John Fisher's.
Knox, north of the town, is separated from Bilton by greenbelt. It straddles Oak Beck, which vehicles used to be able to cross via a ford. This route was blocked in the 1980s and the beck can now be crossed only by pedestrians and cyclists using the adjacent Spruisty packhorse bridge. Cars must go via the A61 (Ripon) road.
Hornbeam Park is a small, recently developed area accessed only by Hookstone Road. It was developed as an office park and retains many offices, and is also home to Harrogate College (formerly part of Hull College Group, but part of Luminate Education Group, previously known as Leeds City College, since 1 August 2019), a Nuffield fitness and wellbeing centre, Travel Inn and restaurant, hospice and some small warehouses. It is served by Hornbeam Park railway station with trains to Harrogate and Leeds.

Economy

Harrogate has a strong and varied economy. The conference and exhibition industry is the focus of the town's business, with Harrogate International Centre the third largest fully integrated conference and exhibition centre in the UK, and one of the largest in Europe. Harrogate draws numerous visitors because of its conference facilities. In 2016 such events alone attracted 300,000 visitors to Harrogate. The convention centre was developed in 2020 to be used as a Nightingale Hospital. However, whilst it has been used in an NHS capacity, it has not treated any Coronavirus patients (as of late January 2021) because the conventional hospitals had not run out of capacity.

It brings in over £150 million to the local economy every year and attracts in excess of 350,000 business visitors annually. The town is home to the Great Yorkshire Showground and Pavilions of Harrogate, which are major conference destinations.

Harrogate is the home of Yorkshire Tea, exported by Taylors of Harrogate, as well as internationally exported Harrogate Spring Water. The town also exports Farrah's Toffee, Harrogate Blue cheese and Debbie & Andrews Harrogate sausages.

The Great Yorkshire Showground is the hub of the regional agricultural industry, hosted by the Yorkshire Agricultural Society. The Great Yorkshire Show, Countryside Live and the twice yearly Harrogate Flower Shows take place there annually. The many business visitors to Harrogate sustain a number of large hotels, some originally built for visitors to the Spa.

Harrogate's main shopping district is focused on Cambridge Street, Oxford Street, Beulah Street and James Street where most of the high street shops can be found. There is a wide range of boutique and designer shopping on Parliament Street and in the Montpellier Quarter, as well as independent shopping around Commercial Street.

Eating out is popular in Harrogate, and the town is well served by restaurants. Parliament Street and Cheltenham Parade are lined with many independent and chain restaurants, while there is a concentration of chain restaurants on John Street and Albert Street.

Companies headquartered in Harrogate 
The following companies are either headquartered or have significant bases in Harrogate.

 Adler and Allan – environmental services to the oil industry
 Association for Perioperative Practice – medical training charity
 Bettys and Taylors of Harrogate – tea rooms, bakers, tea and coffee merchants and blenders
 Messers Fattorini and Sons – jeweller
 Harrogate Convention Centre – conference centre
 Harrogate Spring Water – Bottled water suppliers
 Old Swan Hotel – hotel, part of the Classic Lodges group
 Transdev Blazefield – bus holding company; parent company of Harrogate Bus Company.  Until 1987, Harrogate was also the headquarters of the precursor West Yorkshire Road Car Company.
 White Stone – The Ski Store – ski wear and equipment online store, with retail premises in Harrogate

Landmarks

There are many fine examples of architecture about the town. The only Grade I listed building in Harrogate is St Wilfrid, Duchy Road, which was designed by the architect Temple Lushington Moore and is often considered to be his masterpiece. Another main landmark is the Royal Hall theatre, a Grade II listed building designed by Frank Matcham. As the only surviving Kursaal in Britain, the Royal Hall is an important national heritage building. Restoration work was completed in 2007, and the hall was reopened on 22 January 2008, by the Prince of Wales. In Station Parade stands the Jubilee Memorial, commemorating Queen Victoria's golden jubilee of 1887.

The Royal Pump Room houses Europe's strongest sulphur well, but is now a museum showcasing the town's spa history.

An imposing cenotaph is an important landmark in the centre of the town.

Two military installations are located to the west of Harrogate, the Army Foundation College and RAF Menwith Hill, an electronic monitoring station. There used to be a Royal Air Force supply depot and logistics centre on St George's Road in the south-west of the town, but this closed down in 1994. During the Second World War, RAF Harrogate was also used as a training establishment for medical staff and recruit training for the Women's Auxiliary Air Force.

Montpellier Quarter

Bettys are Tea Rooms established in 1919 owned by Bettys and Taylors of Harrogate – the same company that market Yorkshire Tea. Bettys has a second tea room at the RHS Harlow Carr Gardens.

The Mercer Art Gallery is home to Harrogate district's art collection which consists of some 2,000 works of art, mainly from the 19th and 20th centuries. The collection includes works by William Powell Frith, Atkinson Grimshaw, Sir Edward Burne-Jones, Dame Laura Knight and Alan Davie.

The Montpellier Quarter is the centre of the town's nightlife, which is mainly centred on the renovated Royal Baths development.

Parks and gardens

The Valley Gardens, in Low Harrogate, is the town's main park and covers much of the area originally known as 'Bogs Field', where a number of springs were discovered. The Valley Gardens (locals use the definite article) has an ice-cream parlour, children's play area with outdoor paddling pool, a skate park, frisbee golf, crazy golf and mini golf. The Sun Pavilion at the northern edge of the park can be privately hired for weddings. Tennis courts and a bowling green are in the west of the park. The Friends Of Valley Gardens group was formed in 2009 to support the park. It works in partnership with Harrogate Borough Council to guide the park's development.

The Stray is an area of open parkland in the centre of the town. During the Victorian period, there was a racecourse for horses there.

RHS Harlow Carr gardens, on the western edge of Harrogate, are award-winning themed gardens and are the Royal Horticultural Society's main presence and representative in the North of England.

Crescent Gardens is a small open area in central Harrogate surrounded by some of the town's main tourist attractions including the Royal Pump Room, Royal Baths and Royal Hall, as well as the Harrogate Council Offices. Hall M of the Harrogate International Centre fronts onto Crescent Gardens.

The town has several smaller parks and gardens, including The Softpot Garden at Grove House, the Jubilee Gardens and Victoria Gardens on the eastern side of central Harrogate.

Culture
On 11 January 1900, Harrogate Grand Opera House, now Harrogate Theatre opened with a charity gala in aid of British soldiers fighting the Boer War in South Africa followed on 13 January 1900 by J Tully's pantomime Dick Whittington'.

In 1966, the Harrogate Festival of Arts & Science was established, now known as the Harrogate International Festivals and the North of England's leading arts festival, incorporating a number of festivals within the portfolio including the Theakstons Old Peculier Crime Writing Festival & Theakston's Old Peculier Crime Novel of the Year Award, Raworths Harrogate Literature Festival, Harrogate Music Festival and a number of year-round events within the portfolio.

The town hosted the Eurovision Song Contest 1982 in the Harrogate International Centre.

Harrogate won the 2003 and 2016 Britain in Bloom in the category of 'Large Town' and the European Entente Florale in 2004 reprising its win in the first Entente Florale in 1977. Harrogate was a gold medal winner of Europe in Bloom in 2004. In 2005, a Channel 4 TV show listed Harrogate as the UK's third best place to live. In 2006 it came fourth in the same league; the programme claimed that it placed lower due to "a slight dip in exam results", although presenter Phil Spencer noted that it was his personal favourite.

Harrogate has two orchestras; Harrogate Symphony Orchestra and Harrogate Philharmonic Orchestra.

The town is also home to an underground music scene that has produced heavy metal and punk rock groups including Workshed, Acid Reign and Blood Youth. It is also home to Bombed Out records, an independent record label, who has signed groups such as Fig 4.0.

Sport
Cycling
On 5 July 2014, Harrogate served as the finish line of the first stage of the Tour de France. The event attracted record crowds to the town centre and was televised to a global audience. British cyclist Mark Cavendish was forced to drop out of the race when he crashed a few metres from the finish line and suffered a dislocated shoulder. The town has since been the focal point for finishing stages of the Tour de Yorkshire in 2017. Each event of the 2019 UCI Road World Championships finished in the town, although the entire historic county of Yorkshire was the official host.

Football

Harrogate Town AFC play at Wetherby Road. The club competes in League Two, the fourth tier of English football, following promotion to the English Football League, which came via victory in the 2019–20 National League Play-offs. They have a historical rivalry with Harrogate Railway Athletic F.C., of the Northern Counties East Football League, located at Station View.

Harrogate RUFC is a North Premier team and formerly based at The County Ground, Claro Road but relocated to Rudding Lane to the South side of the town.

Cricket
Harrogate Cricket Club is to be the home of Yorkshire Women cricket team. Until 1995 the town hosted one Yorkshire county game per year at the St George's Road cricket ground. Since 2022, the ground has been sponsored by Kirbys Solicitors. In 2008, a fire destroyed the historic old pavilion at the ground but it has since been re-built with a modern pavilion, bar, function room and changing rooms.

Harrogate Cricket Club has 4 Saturday teams:
 1st XI play in the Yorkshire Premier League North, it was the league's inaugural champions in 2016 and it is one of the legible to play in the Yorkshire championship whenever the team wins the league. The team former played in the Yorkshire ECB County Premier League until 2016.
 2nd XI play in York Senior League – Division 2
 3rd XI (also known as "Harrogate Strays") play in Nidderdale League Division 1
 4th XI (also known as "Harrogate Devs") play in Nidderdale League Division 5

Bilton Cricket Club, off Bilton Lane provides opportunities for players of all ages to play in Local League Cricket, Bilton Cricket Club have a good natured rivalry with Harrogate Cricket Club with Bilton defeating Harrogate at St Georges Road in the Black Sheep Trophy of 2006.

Other
Accord to designer Thomas Heatherwick, the Olympic Cauldron for the 2012 London Olympics was built in a ‘Bond Gadget Workshop’ in Harrogate. 

Harrogate Harriers run from Harrogate Squash & Fitness Centre on Hookstone Drive and Nidd Valley Road Runners share the premises of Harrogate Hockey Club. Harrogate District Swimming Club is an amateur level swimming club that has had teams compete at National level. Rock climbing is a sport in and around Harrogate, indoors at the Harrogate Climbing Centre and at Almscliffe Crag and Brimham Rocks.

Transport
Rail

Line to Ripon 
The Ripon line was closed to passengers on 6 March 1967 and to freight on 5 September 1969 as part of the wider Beeching Axe, despite a vigorous campaign by local campaigners, including the city's MP. Today much of the route of the line through the city is now a relief road and although the former station still stands it is now surrounded by a new housing development. The issue remains a significant one in local politics and there are movements to restore the line. Campaigners call on MPs to restore Ripon railway link.

Buses
Buses are every 15 minutes between Harrogate, Ripon and Leeds (via Harewood, Moortown and Chapel Allerton) on route 36, which run more frequently at peak time and overnight on Fridays and Saturdays between Leeds and Harrogate. The 7 route runs to Leeds via Wetherby, Boston Spa and Seacroft as well as other parts of semi-rural Leeds. There are services to Otley, Bradford, Knaresborough and Pateley Bridge.

Road transport to Leeds is via the A61 (north and central Leeds), A658 (north-west Leeds/Leeds Bradford Airport) and A661 (for north-east Leeds). The A61 continues northwards to Ripon, while the A658 connects to Bradford after passing through north-west Leeds. The A658 also forms the Harrogate Bypass that skirts the south and east of the town, joining the A59 linking York and the A1(M) to the east and Skipton to the west with Harrogate.

Harrogate bus station is in the town centre. It is managed by Harrogate Bus Company, the main operator.
 The 13 stands are also used by Connexionsbuses, Transdev York & Country and National Express.

In 2018 all bus routes that operated within Harrogate and did not venture to other towns became served by electric buses.  These buses charge on stands 1–3 at Harrogate bus station.  The scheme is part funded by the government's Low Emission Bus Scheme.

Airports
Teesside and Doncaster Sheffield are next nearest to the town while Manchester Airport is accessible by rail via .

Harrogate has a non-civilian airport of its own at RAF Linton-on-Ouse, which carries the IATA code HRT for Harrogate.

Education
Harrogate High School was rebuilt under a governmental scheme in mid-2017. It is also home to many private schools in the town centre and others in the surrounding areas, such as Queen Ethelbuga's.
 Ashville College
 Harrogate College, (was part of Leeds Metropolitan University until 1 August 2008, when it transferred to Hull College), and now part of the Leeds-based Luminate Education Group.
 Harrogate Grammar School, (An academy, part of the Red Kite Learning Trust) Specialist in Language and Technology
 Harrogate High School, a specialist Sports College
 Harrogate Ladies' College
 Harrogate Tutorial College
 Rossett School a specialist computing and mathematics college.
 St. Aidan's C of E High School, a specialist Language and Science School.
 St John Fisher Catholic High School, a specialist arts and humanities school.
 Army Foundation College

Media
The town's main printed news source is the Harrogate Advertiser, part of Ackrill Media Group. The newspaper was first printed in 1836.
The Stray Ferret is an online news service for the Harrogate district.
The Harrogate Informer publishes news online throughout the district.
The local radio stations are BBC Radio York on 104.3 & 103.7 FM and Greatest Hits Radio Harrogate & The Yorkshire Dales on 97.2 FM.
Local news and television programmes are provided by BBC Yorkshire and BBC North East & Cumbria on BBC One and ITV Yorkshire & ITV Tyne Tees on ITV.

Notable statistics

In 2012, Harrogate had the highest concentration of drink-drivers in the UK. A March 2013 survey from the British property website Rightmove ranked Harrogate as the "happiest place" to live in the United Kingdom; the same result was seen in 2014 and 2015. In 2014, Harrogate District Hospital had the best cancer care of any hospital in England.

Notable people

Olly Alexander (born 1990), singer and musician
Donald Simpson Bell, (1890–1916), First World War Victoria Cross recipient
Sir Dhunjibhoy Bomanji (1862–1937), shipping magnate, philanthropist.
Dewey Bunnell (born 1952), singer and songwriter with the band America
Jim Carter (born 1948) actor
Edward Chapman (1901–1977), actor
Ben Coad, (1994), English cricketer
Rachel Daly (1991), English Footballer
Oliver Dingley (born 1992), Olympic diver
Ian Douglas-Wilson (1912–2013), physician and editor of The Lancet''
Jenny Duncalf (born 1982), squash player
Richard Ellis (1820–1895), one of the first mayors of Harrogate.
Bernard Walter Evans (1843–1922), landscape painter and watercolourist. Harrogate resident 1890s to 1911.
John Farrah (1849–1907) grocer, confectioner, biologist, born in Harrogate.
Gerald Finzi (1901–1956), composer
Courtenay Foote (1879–1925), silent-film actor
Samson Fox (1838–1903), engineer, industrialist, and philanthropist
Luke Garbutt (born 1993), footballer for Blackpool, attended Harrogate Grammar School.
Thom Sonny Green (born 1985), drummer for indie rock band Alt-J.
H. L. A. Hart (1907–1992), legal philosopher
Thomas Holroyd (1821–1904), portrait and landscape painter, co-owner of photographic studio T & J. Holroyd.
Charles Hull VC (1890–1953), soldier
Garry Jennings, musician born in Harrogate.
Mik Kaminski (born 1951), violinist and band member of ELO and Violinski 
Jack Laugher (born 1995), Olympic Diver.
Christina Le Moignan (born 1942) Minister and academic, who served as President of the British Methodist Conference 
Peter McCormick (born 1952), solicitor, Chairman of the Premier League, Vice Chairman of The Football Association
Fridel Meyer (1904–1982), Long-distance kayaker and businesswoman. German-born; later a Harrogate resident.
Sarah Moore (born 1993), a racing driver who competes in the W Series
David Nobbs (1935–2015) author and screenwriter, creator of Reginald Perrin
Andy O'Brien (born 1979), footballer for the Vancouver Whitecaps.
Jack Ogden, jewellery historian, grew up in Harrogate.
Gord Pettinger (born 11 November 1911 in Harrogate, England – d. 12 April 1986) was a British professional ice hockey centre
Richard Ridgeway (1848–1924), Victoria Cross recipient, lived his later life and died in Harrogate
Ilona Rodgers (born 1942), actress
Arnold Shaw  (1896–1972), British Army officer and cricketer
David Simpson (1860–1931), former freeman and four times mayor of Harrogate, and contractor who built the Grand Hotel in the town.
John Smith (1797–1866)), philanthropist, partner in Beckett's Bank, and founder of the Harrogate mansion "Belvedere", where he lived in retirement..
Hugo Speer (born 1968), actor
Jonathan Tattersall (born 1994), cricketer
William John Seward Webber (1842–1919), sculptor
Mark Wharton, musician born in Harrogate

See also
 Association of Harrogate Apprentices
 Churches in Harrogate
Harrogate power station
 Harrogate (Stonefall) Commonwealth War Graves Commission Cemetery
 Harrogate District Hospital
 List of public art in Harrogate
 List of spa towns in the United Kingdom

References

Sources

External links

 Harrogate Borough Council
 Harrogate Turkish Baths
 Project Gutenberg etext of Edmund Deane's Spadacrene Anglica

 English Heritage, Aerial Photo Explorer (Enter "Harrogate" in search box)

 
Towns in North Yorkshire
Spa towns in England
Unparished areas in North Yorkshire
Borough of Harrogate